The Association for Symbolic Logic (ASL) is an international organization of specialists in mathematical logic and philosophical logic.  The ASL was founded in 1936, and its first president was Alonzo Church. The current president of the ASL is Julia F. Knight.

Publications 

The ASL publishes books and academic journals.  Its three official journals are:
 Journal of Symbolic Logic (website) – publishes research in all areas of mathematical logic.  Founded in 1936, .
 Bulletin of Symbolic Logic (website) – publishes primarily expository articles and reviews. Founded in 1995, . 
 Review of Symbolic Logic (website) – publishes research relating to logic, philosophy, science, and their interactions. Founded in 2008, .

In addition, the ASL has a sponsored journal:  
 Journal of Logic and Analysis (website) – publishes research on the interactions between mathematical logic and pure and applied analysis.  Founded in 2009 as an open-access successor to the Springer journal Logic and Analysis. .

The organization played a part in publishing the collected writings of Kurt Gödel.

Meetings 

The ASL holds two main meetings every year, one in North America and one in Europe (the latter known as the Logic Colloquium). In addition, the ASL regularly holds joint meetings with both the American Mathematical Society ("AMS") and the American Philosophical Association ("APA"), and sponsors meetings in many different countries every year.

List of presidents

Awards
The association periodically presents a number of prizes and awards.

Karp Prize
The Karp Prize is awarded by the association every five years for an outstanding paper or book in the field of symbolic logic. It consists of a cash award and was established in 1973 in memory of Professor Carol Karp.

Sacks Prize
The Sacks Prize is awarded for the most outstanding doctoral dissertation in mathematical logic. It consists of a cash award and was established in 1999 to honor Professor Gerald Sacks of MIT and Harvard.

Recipients include:

Shoenfield Prize
Inaugurated in 2007, the Shoenfield Prize is awarded every three years in two categories, book and article, recognizing outstanding expository writing in the field of logic and honoring the name of Joseph R. Shoenfield.

Recipients include:

References

External links
 ASL website

Learned societies of the United States
Mathematical logic organizations
Philosophical logic
Philosophy organizations
Organizations established in 1936